Guinn is both a surname and a given name. Notable people with the name include:

Surname:
Bill Guinn or Lew Meehan (1890–1951), American film actor
Colin Guinn, contestant in The Amazing Race, a U.S. TV series
Dominick Guinn, (born 1975), American professional boxer
Ernest Allen Guinn (1905–1974), United States federal judge
Kenny Guinn (1936–2010), American businessman, educator and politician
Nora Guinn (1920–2005), American judge
Robert Henry Guinn (1822–1887), Texas politician
Skip Guinn (born 1944), former Major League Baseball pitcher
Thomas Guinn (1836–1908), Union Army soldier during the American Civil War

Given name:
Guinn Smith (1920–2004), American athlete, 1948 Olympic champion in the pole vault
Guinn Williams (actor) (1899–1962), American actor who appeared in memorable westerns
Guinn Williams (Texas politician) (1871–1948), U.S. Representative from Texas

See also
Guinn Run, Pennsylvania stream flowing southeastward in the Gettysburg National Military Park
Guinn v. United States, 238 U.S. 347 (1915), U.S. Supreme Court decision on state constitutions that set qualifications for voters
Guinan (disambiguation)
Guinea (disambiguation)
Guinee
Guiney